Work It may refer to:

 "Work It" (Missy Elliott song), 2002
 "Work It" (Nelly song), 2003 song featuring Justin Timberlake
 Work It (film), a 2020 American film
 Work It (TV series), a 2012 American sitcom
 "Work It", a song by Monrose from the album Temptation
 Work It, album by Rick Margitza 1995
 Work It! Convenience Store, a mobile game based on the webtoon Welcome to Convenience Store